Ali Günçar (born 19 May 1970) is a retired Turkish football defender.

He was also a squad member at the 1991 Mediterranean Games

References

1970 births
Living people
Turkish footballers
Gençlerbirliği S.K. footballers
Beşiktaş J.K. footballers
Samsunspor footballers
Adanaspor footballers
Association football defenders
Turkey international footballers
Competitors at the 1991 Mediterranean Games
People from Afyonkarahisar
Mediterranean Games competitors for Turkey
20th-century Turkish people